The 1977 Ready Plan Insurance Phillip Island 500K was a motor race staged at the Phillip Island circuit in Victoria, Australia on 20 November 1977. It was final round of the 1977 Australian Touring Car Championship and of the 1977 Australian Championship of Makes, and as such was open to Group C Touring Cars. The race was won by Allan Grice driving a Holden Torana.

Class system
As the race was a round of the 1977 Australian Championship of Makes, cars competed in four engine displacement classes:
 Class A: Up to 1300cc
 Class B: 1301 to 2000cc
 Class C: 2001 to 3000cc
 Class D: 3001 to 6000cc

Race results

There were 48 starters and 28 classified finishers in the race.

References

External links
 Image of the winning car, www.motorsportarchive.com

Phillip Island 500
Ready Plan Insurance Phillip Island 500K
November 1977 sports events in Australia